The Sheslay River is a tributary of the Inklin River in northwest part of the province of British Columbia, Canada.
 It joins the Nahlin River to form the Inklin River, one of the main tributaries of the Taku River. The lower Sheslay River marks the boundary between the Taku Plateau and the Nahlin Plateau. Its mouth at the Nahlin River marks the junction of the Taku, Nahlin, and Kawdy Plateaus. All three of these are part of the larger Stikine Plateau region.

The Sheslay River is in the traditional territory of the Taku River Tlingit First Nation, part of the Tlingit people.

The Sheslay River originates in the Cheja Range of the Boundary Ranges, close to the headwaters of the Chutine River and the Stikine Icecap. The confluence of the Sheslay and Nahlin Rivers marks the beginning of the Inklin River.

Major tributaries of the Sheslay River include Shearer Creek, Moosehorn Creek, Hackett River and Egnell Creek, Samotua River, and Tatsatua Creek. The middle Sheslay River, above the Samotua River, lies between the Chechidla Range and Level Mountain. The small settlement of Sheslay is located at the confluence of the Sheslay and Hackett Rivers. The lower Sheslay River, below the mouth of the Samotua River, flows just south and west of Heart Peaks, part of the Nahlin Plateau. The lowermost Sheslay River flows between the Taku and Nahlin Plateaus. Its confluence with the Nahlin River forms the Inklin River.

The Sheslay River supports a number salmonids, including Chinook salmon, coho salmon, sockeye salmon, steelhead trout, rainbow trout, lake trout, Dolly Varden trout, bull trout, and round whitefish. It also supports populations of coastrange sculpin and slimy sculpin.

See also
List of British Columbia rivers

References

External links
 

 

Atlin District
Cassiar Country
Rivers of British Columbia
Rivers of the Boundary Ranges
Taku Plateau
Tlingit